Xylocopa ruficornis, or Xylocopa (Koptortosoma) ruficornis, is a species of carpenter bee. It is found in the Sri Lankan.

References 

 Animal-diversity Xylocopa ruficornis
 Itis - Xylocopa ruficornis

Further reading 

Ruggiero M. (project leader), Ascher J. et al. (2013). ITIS Bees: World Bee Checklist (version Sep 2009). In: Species 2000 & ITIS Catalogue of Life, 11 March 2013 (Roskov Y., Kunze T., Paglinawan L., Orrell T., Nicolson D., Culham A., Bailly N., Kirk P., Bourgoin T., Baillargeon G., Hernandez F., De Wever A., eds). Digital resource at www.catalogueoflife.org/col/. Species 2000: Reading, UK.
John Ascher, Connal Eardley, Terry Griswold, Gabriel Melo, Andrew Polaszek, Michael Ruggiero, Paul Williams, Ken Walker, and Natapot Warrit.

ruficornis
Insects of Bangladesh
Insects of Sri Lanka
Insects described in 1804